Thermochiton is a genus of polyplacophoran molluscs in the family Ischnochitonidae.

Species
 Thermochiton papuaensis Sirenko, 2020
 Thermochiton undocostatus Saito & Okutani, 1990
 Thermochiton xui H. Wang, J. L. Zhang & Sirenko, 2022

References

 Saito, O. ; Okutani, T. (1990). Two New Chitons (Mollusca:Polyplacophora) from a Hydrothermal Vent Site of the Iheya Small Ridge, Okinawa Trough, East China Sea. VENUS (The Japanese Journals of Malacology). 49(3): 165-179

Ischnochitonidae
Chiton families